Denis Štojs (born 23 January 1978) is a Slovenian motorcycle speedway rider.

Craeer
Štojs was a member of Slovenia team at 2002 and 2003 Speedway World Cup. He started in Speedway Grand Prix as a wild card.

He medalled five times at the Slovenian Individual Speedway Championship, always winning the bronze.

Honours

World Championships 
 Individual Speedway World Championship (Speedway Grand Prix)
 2003 - 47th place (1 pt in one event)
 2005 - did not started as track reserve
 Team World Championship  (Speedway World Team Cup and Speedway World Cup)
 2002 - 11th place (1 pt in Event 3)
 2003 - 9th place (2 pts in Event 2)
 2005 - 2nd place in Qualifying round 2
 2006 - 2nd place in Qualifying round 2
 2008 - 3rd place in Qualifying round 2

European Championships 

 European Pairs Championship
 2004 -  Debrecen - 6th place (5 pts)
 2007 - 4th place in Semi-Final 1
 European Club Champions' Cup
 2001 - 4th place in Group A

See also 
 Slovenia national speedway team
 List of Speedway Grand Prix riders

References

External links 
 (en) (pl) Denis Štojs at www.lubusports.pl

Slovenian speedway riders
1978 births
Living people
Sportspeople from Novo Mesto